Kim Ji-young (born July 8, 2005) is a South Korean actress who began her career as a child actress, notably in the 2014 television drama Jang Bo-ri is Here!.

Filmography

Film

Television series

Awards and nominations

References

External links

2005 births
Living people
South Korean child actresses
South Korean television actresses
South Korean film actresses
21st-century South Korean actresses